Fourbi is a 1996 French-Swiss drama film directed by Alain Tanner. It was screened in the Un Certain Regard section at the 1996 Cannes Film Festival.

Cast
 Karin Viard - Rosemonde
 Jean-Quentin Châtelain - Paul
 Cécile Tanner - Marie
 Antoine Basler - Pierrot
 Robert Bouvier - Kevin
 Maurice Aufair - Paul's Father
 Jean-Luc Bideau - Cameo appearance
 Teco Celio - Le Garagiste
 Jed Curtis - Le Sponsor
 Jacques Denis - Cameo appearance
 François Florey - La Comédien
 Michèle Gleizer - Paul's Mother
 Nathalie Jeannet - La Comédien
 Thierry Jorand - Le Dragueur
 Jocelyne Maillard - La Comédien
 Pierre Maulini - L'huissier
 Jacques Michel - Patron de Bistrôt
 Jean-Marc Morel - L'hômme ivre
 Ariane Moret - La Vendeuse
 Frédéric Polier - Le Chasseur
 Jacques Probst - Le Client de café

References

External links

1996 films
1990s French-language films
1996 drama films
Films directed by Alain Tanner
French drama films
Swiss drama films
French-language Swiss films
1990s French films